John Strachan was a member of the Wisconsin State Assembly.

Biography
Strachan was born on June 13, 1834, in Aberdeen, Scotland. He graduated from what is now the University of Aberdeen. Later, he was a member of the United States Army during the Coeur d'Alene War.

Political career
Strachan was a member of the Assembly during the 1872 session. Previously, he was an unsuccessful candidate for the United States House of Representatives from Wisconsin's 3rd congressional district, losing to J. Allen Barber. Strachan was a Democrat.

References

Politicians from Aberdeen
Scottish emigrants to the United States
Democratic Party members of the Wisconsin State Assembly
American military personnel of the Indian Wars
Military personnel from Wisconsin
Alumni of the University of Aberdeen
1834 births
Year of death missing